The 1946–47 National Football League was the 16th staging of the National Football League, an annual Gaelic football tournament for the Gaelic Athletic Association county teams of Ireland.

Derry won their first league title. Although they had traditionally worn red, they wore white jerseys with a red band in the final, and have kept those colours since.

Results

Semi-final

Final

References

National Football League
National Football League
National Football League (Ireland) seasons